According to the Pew Research Center, Protestants in Eritrea number about 40,000, which represents less than 1% of the population. The Evangelical Lutheran Church of Eritrea is one of the four officially recognized religious institutions in Eritrea; however, Protestants of other denominations (particularly Jehovah's Witnesses) face persecution from the Eritrean government. The United States Department of State (USDoS) names it a Country of Particular Concern due to its violation of religious liberty. It has been reported that entire families are thrown into jail. According to the Barnabas Fund, Christians (regardless of denomination) in Eritrea have been subjected to torture, including being held in shipping containers.

History
Protestantism has had a presence in Eritrea for over 150 years. The Swedish Evangelical Mission (SEM) first sent missionaries to preach to the Kunama people in 1866. Between the late-19th and late-20th centuries, the SEM undertook the task of translating the Bible into various Eritrean languages.

Jehovah's Witnesses have been a target of government persecution since Eritrea's independence, as they opposed the referendum for independence and have refused to participate in compulsory military service. They have been stripped of their rights and subjected to imprisonment; the United States Department of State reports that 24 Jehovah's Witnesses are currently detained.

In 2002, the Eritrean government closed down places of worship of all unrecognized religious groups, including Jehovah's Witnesses and Protestant churches separate from the Evangelical Lutheran Church of Eritrea. The USDoS reports that 345 church leaders and between 800 and 1,000 laypeople are currently detained.

Denominations
Amnesty International reports that the following evangelical denominations are present in Eritrea:
Seventh-day Adventists
Mullu Wongel (Full Gospel) Church
Kale Hiwot (Word of Life) Church
Meseret  Kristos  Church
Rema Church
Hallelujah Church
Faith Mission
Faith Church of Christ 
Philadelphia Church 
Presbyterian Evangelical Church
Trinity Fellowship Church
Dubre Bethel Church
Church of the Living God 
New Covenant Church

References

Christianity in Eritrea
Eritrea